Bivin of Gorze (810/830–863) was a Frankish founder of the Bivinids family. He was married to a daughter of Boso the Elder, who may have been called Richildis. During his life he functioned as lay abbot of the Gorze Abbey. His offspring includes:
Richilde of Provence, who married King Charles the Bald; 
Richard the Justiciar, Duke of Burgundy; 
 Boso, King of Provence;
 possibly Bivin, Count of Metz.

Notes

Sources
Pierre Riché, The Carolingians, a family who forged Europe.

Bosonids
9th-century births
863 deaths

Year of birth uncertain